Obed Taylor (April 27, 1824 - August 2, 1881) was an architect who designed many notable buildings in early Utah that survive on the National Register of Historic Places. Taylor's works include the Salt Lake Assembly Hall on Temple Square, the Salt Lake 18th Ward meetinghouse, and Ogden's Z.C.M.I. and First National Bank Block. Though Thomas L. Allen has been credited with being the architect of the Summit Stake Tabernacle, Taylor approved of the plans and likely assisted Allen who was untrained as an architect. Obed Taylor worked in partnership with William H. Folsom on many projects including the Deseret National Bank, ZCMI's cast-iron storefront (1876), and the Feramorz Little residence. He died at the height of his architectural career in 1881. Funeral services were held in the Salt Lake 18th Ward meetinghouse which he had recently designed. The Walker Opera House as well as a building at the University of Deseret were designed by Taylor but completed after his death.

Personal life
He was baptized into the Church of Jesus Christ of Latter-day Saints by Parley P. Pratt and came to Salt Lake City, Utah in 1871.

Notes

1824 births
1881 deaths
Architects from Utah
Architects of Latter Day Saint religious buildings and structures
19th-century American architects
American Latter Day Saints